Tharrhalea is a genus of crab spiders first described in 1875 by Ludwig Carl Christian Koch.

Species
, it contains seventeen species:

Tharrhalea albipes L. Koch, 1875 — New Guinea, Northern Australia
Tharrhalea bicornis Simon, 1895 — Philippines
Tharrhalea cerussata Simon, 1886 — Madagascar
Tharrhalea evanida (L. Koch, 1867) — New Guinea, Northern Territory, Queensland, New South Wales
Tharrhalea fusca (Thorell, 1877) — Sulawesi
Tharrhalea irrorata (Thorell, 1881) — Queensland
Tharrhalea luzonica (Karsch, 1880) — Philippines
Tharrhalea maculata Kulczyński, 1911 — New Guinea
Tharrhalea mariae Barrion & Litsinger, 1995 — Philippines
Tharrhalea multopunctata (L. Koch, 1874) — New Guinea, Western Australia, South Australia, Queensland, New South Wales, Victoria
Tharrhalea praetexta (L. Koch, 1865) — Samoa
Tharrhalea prasina (L. Koch, 1876) — Queensland, New South Wales
Tharrhalea pulleinei (Rainbow, 1915) — South Australia, New South Wales
Tharrhalea semiargentea Simon, 1895 — Madagascar
Tharrhalea superpicta Simon, 1886 — Madagascar
Tharrhalea variabilis (L. Koch, 1875) — Queensland, New South Wales
Tharrhalea variegata Kulczyński, 1911 — New Guinea

References

Thomisidae
Araneomorphae genera
Spiders of Asia
Spiders of Oceania
Spiders of Africa